Rosa Emilia Rodríguez-Vélez is an American lawyer who was the United States Attorney for the District of Puerto Rico from 2007 to 2019.  She is a career prosecutor, first in the Puerto Rico Department of Justice and subsequently in the U.S. Attorney's office in San Juan.

Education and early career
She holds a master's degree in Criminal Justice (1974) and a Juris Doctor Degree (1977) from the Interamerican University of Puerto Rico School of Law.

She was appointed by then Governor Carlos Romero Barceló as a local district attorney in 1979. She subsequently crossed over to the federal level, serving in different prosecution and managerial roles within the United States Attorney's office.

U.S. Attorney for District of Puerto Rico
She was appointed United States Attorney for the District of Puerto Rico by the Attorney General of the United States in June 2006 and nominated by President George W. Bush in January 2007, but the United States Senate never confirmed her due to an unsubstantiated "procedural hold" placed on her nomination by Democratic Senator Bob Menendez. Senator Menéndez was known to have close personal ties to then Governor of Puerto Rico Anibal Acevedo-Vila, whom U.S. Attorney Rodríguez-Vélez had charged with 19 counts of corruption while still in office (for the period of time when Mr. Acevedo-Vilá had served as Puerto Rico's Resident Commissioner in the United States Congress). On October 13, 2007, the seven judges of the United States District Court for the District of Puerto Rico unanimously authorized Chief Judge José A. Fusté to extend her appointment for four years, until October 12, 2011.  On October 13, 2011, after no other U.S. President nominated her again, she was sworn into a second term by Chief Judge Aida Delgado after a unanimous decision by the six members of the District Court. Her appointments were never confirmed by the United States Senate. Her term as U.S. Attorney ended on November 30, 2019, when she retired after 31 years of service in the United States Department of Justice.

Prominent cases
In October 2010, she stood beside Attorney General Eric Holder at the Justice Department headquarters as he announced the arrest of 89 police officers and 44 other people in Puerto Rico for facilitating drug deals, in what has been described as the largest law enforcement corruption probe in FBI history.

See also

United States Attorney General
United States Department of Justice
Puerto Rico Department of Justice
List of Puerto Ricans
History of women in Puerto Rico

References

External links
Official Profile, USAO
Office of the United States Attorneys

Living people
United States Attorneys for the District of Puerto Rico
Puerto Rican lawyers
Interamerican University of Puerto Rico alumni
Year of birth missing (living people)
Puerto Rican women lawyers
20th-century Puerto Rican lawyers
21st-century Puerto Rican lawyers
20th-century American women lawyers
20th-century American lawyers
21st-century American women lawyers
21st-century American lawyers